Lieutenant Colonel William Temple VC (7 November 1833 – 13 February 1919) was a British Army officer and an Irish recipient of the Victoria Cross (VC), the highest award for gallantry in the face of the enemy that can be awarded to British and Commonwealth forces.

Early life
Temple was born in Monaghan Town, Ireland, on 7 November 1833.

Victoria Cross
Temple was 30 years old and an Assistant Surgeon in the Royal Regiment of Artillery during the Invasion of Waikato (one of the campaigns in the New Zealand Wars), when the following deed took place on 20 November 1863 at Rangiriri, New Zealand for which he and Lieutenant Arthur Frederick Pickard were awarded the VC:

From 1884 until 1889 he served in India as a Lieutenant Colonel and Secretary to the Surgeon-General of the Indian Medical Service. On 10 April 1885 he became Brigade Surgeon and from 1886 until 1889 was Honorary Surgeon to the Viceroy of India. Temple died in Tunbridge Wells, Kent, and is buried in the Highland Road Cemetery in Portsmouth, Hampshire.

References

External links
Location of grave and VC medal (Hampshire)

1833 births
1919 deaths
Military personnel from County Monaghan
Burials in Hampshire
19th-century Irish people
Irish officers in the British Army
Irish military doctors
Irish recipients of the Victoria Cross
British military personnel of the New Zealand Wars
New Zealand Wars recipients of the Victoria Cross
People from County Monaghan
Indian Medical Service officers
Alumni of Trinity College Dublin
British Army regimental surgeons
Royal Artillery officers
British Army recipients of the Victoria Cross